Kolodong, New South Wales is a locality between Taree and Wingham in the Manning Valley on the Mid North Coast of New South Wales, Australia in the Mid-Coast.  Kolodong contains some agricultural land, a small residential area and a sizable industrial area.  Kolodong is home to a day care centre, Taree Baptist Church and Taree Christian College.

References

Mid North Coast
Towns in New South Wales